Rainer Hinesser (born 10 January 1931) is an Austrian footballer. He played in one match for the Austria national football team in 1953.

References

External links
 

1931 births
Living people
Austrian footballers
Austria international footballers
Place of birth missing (living people)
Association footballers not categorized by position